Asumah Abubakar-Ankrah (born 10 May 1997) is a footballer who plays as a forward for Swiss club Luzern. Born in Ghana, he is a youth international for Portugal.

Club career
Born in Kumasi, Ghana, Abubakar had a successful trial with Willem II in the summer of 2015, but he had to wait to the following year to sign a contract due to work permit problems. He eventually received a Portuguese passport as his father had been working in the nation for several years, and on 2 March 2016 he committed to the Dutch club on a short-term deal.

On 2 April 2016, whilst still a junior, Abubakar made his senior debut, coming on as a late substitute in a 2–3 Eredivisie home loss against FC Twente. He transferred to MVV Maastricht for the 2018-2019 season on a free transfer. After 27 appearances and another goalless season Abubakar transferred to Swiss club SC Kriens. On the 28th July 2019, he would score his first professional goal against FC Aarau after being subbed on in the 71st minute. He ended the season third in the top scorer rankings. In his second season, despite Kriens finishing mid-table, he again finished third in the scoring charts and won the Switzerland Challenge League Best Player Award. Abubakar transferred to Swiss Super League club FC Lugano at the start of the 2021-2022 season for 100,000 Euros. He scored his first goal for Lugano on his third appearance in a 1–1 draw with FC Basel.

On 14 January 2022, Abubakar signed a contract with Luzern until 30 June 2024.

International career
Having acquired Portuguese citizenship, Abubakar chose to represent that country. On 16 June 2016, he was selected for a 23-man preliminary list for the 2016 UEFA European Under-19 Championship and also made the final squad, scoring in a 4–3 group stage win over the hosts Germany. Shortly after, however, after doubts arose regarding his eligibility, the Portuguese Football Federation opted to immediately remove him from the competition pending further approval.

Career statistics

Club

References

External links

National team data 

1997 births
Living people
Footballers from Kumasi
Portuguese footballers
Portugal youth international footballers
Ghanaian footballers
Portuguese people of Ghanaian descent
Ghanaian emigrants to Portugal
Association football forwards
Eredivisie players
Eerste Divisie players
Willem II (football club) players
MVV Maastricht players
SC Kriens players
FC Lugano players
FC Luzern players
Swiss Challenge League players
Swiss Super League players
Portuguese expatriate footballers
Ghanaian expatriate footballers
Expatriate footballers in the Netherlands
Expatriate footballers in Switzerland
Ghanaian expatriate sportspeople in Portugal
Ghanaian expatriate sportspeople in the Netherlands
Ghanaian expatriate sportspeople in Switzerland
Portuguese expatriate sportspeople in the Netherlands
Portuguese expatriate sportspeople in Switzerland